Daniel Nestor and Nenad Zimonjić were the defending champions, but Zimonjić decided to compete in Valencia instead.  Nestor played alongside Vasek Pospisil, but lost in the first round to Denis Istomin and Horacio Zeballos.
Treat Huey and Dominic Inglot won the title, defeating Julian Knowle and Oliver Marach in the final, 6–3, 3–6, [10–4].

Seeds

Draw

Draw

References
 Main Draw

Swiss Indoors - Doubles
2013 Doubles
2013 in Swiss tennis